Cloyna is a rural locality in the South Burnett Region, Queensland, Australia. In the  Cloyna had a population of 142 people.

History 

Cloyna State School opened on 20 February 1911.

The construction of the Lutheran Church was completed in May 1911 with the church officially opening on Coronation Day, 22 June 1911.

Cloyna Baptist Church opened in 1924. It was officially opened on 15 March 1924. It closed circa 1990. It was located at 71 Cloyna West Road. It was close to the Cloyna railway station. It is now in private ownership.

The former Cloyna railway station was on the now-closed Windera railway line. The line operated from 1925 to 1961.

In 2007, the building of the former Anglican Church of the Holy Trinity at 2272 Gayndah Road, Kitoba, was relocated to Cloyna State School. The church was opened on 24 May 1957 by Archdeacon Richards. It was closed on 3 June 2005 by Assistant Bishop Nolan.

In the  Cloyna had a population of 142 people.

Education 
Cloyna State School is a government primary (Prep-6) school for boys and girls at 8 William Webber Road. In 2018, the school had an enrolment of 15 students with 4 teachers (3 full-time equivalent) and 4 non-teaching staff (2 full-time equivalent).

References 

South Burnett Region
Localities in Queensland